Preparations is a studio album by Prefuse 73. It was released on Warp Records in 2007.

Unlike the 2006 EP, Security Screenings, Preparations is considered the proper follow-up to the 2005 album, Surrounded by Silence.

The album includes a 15-track bonus disc entitled Interregnums, which features "unheard explorations into orchestral soundtrack music", including compositions played by live musicians.

Track listing

References

External links
 

2007 albums
Prefuse 73 albums
Warp (record label) albums